Thomas Pope, 2nd Earl of Downe (1622–1660) was an English nobleman and Royalist.

Life
Baptised at Cogges, near Witney, 16 December 1622, the eldest of the three sons of Sir William Pope, Knt. (1596–1624), by Elizabeth, sole heiress of Sir Thomas Watson, knt., of Halstead, Kent. His mother married, after his father's death, Sir Thomas Penyston, 1st Baronet, of Cornwall, Oxfordshire. His grandfather Sir William Pope of Wroxton Abbey, near Banbury, was created Earl of Downe in the kingdom of Ireland, and died on 2 July 1631. Thomas, his grandson succeeded to his title, and to the large estates in north-west Oxfordshire which had been settled on the family in 1555 by Sir Thomas Pope.

The young Earl was brought up at the house of his guardian, John Dutton of Sherborne. On 26 November 1638 he married his guardian's daughter Lucy, and on 21 June 1639 matriculated as a nobleman at Christ Church, Oxford; but he offended against academic discipline, and before 13 March 1641 he left the university.

When the First English Civil War broke out, Downe raised a troop of horse, and was in Oxford with the king in 1643. Charles I slept at his wife's house at Cubberley, Gloucestershire, on 6 September 1643 and 12 July 1644. In 1645, his estate being valued at £2,202 per annum, he was fined £5,000 by the committee for compounding. He took the oath and covenant before 24 October 1645, but had difficulty in raising money for his fine, and in 1648 his other debts amounted to £11,000. The sequestration was finally discharged on 18 April 1651, after he had sold, under powers obtained by a private act in 1650, all his lands, except the manors of Cogges and Wilcote, Cubberley, which he held in right of his wife, and Enstone, with the adjacent townships.

Death
Downe left England, and travelled in France and Italy. He died at the royalist coffeehouse of Arthur Tilliard in Oxford, 28 December 1660. His body was buried among his ancestors at Wroxton 11 January 1661, with an inscribed floor-slab in the chancel.

Family
Lucy, Countess of Downe died 6 April 1656, and was buried at Cubberley. Just before Downe's death his only child, Elizabeth (born at Cogges 15 April 1645), married Sir Francis Lee, 4th Baronet. Her second husband was Robert Bertie, 3rd Earl of Lindsey; and the Enstone property descended through her to the Viscounts Dillon. The peerage passed to Pope's uncle, Thomas Pope, 3rd Earl of Downe.

Notes

Attribution

1622 births
1660 deaths
Cavaliers
Earls in the Peerage of Ireland